Al Sheikh Abdullah bin Zaher bin Saif Al Hussani is the Ambassador Extraordinary and Plenipotentiary of the Sultanate of Oman to the Russian Federation.

See also 
 Foreign relations of Oman
 Oman–Russia relations

References 

Year of birth missing (living people)
Living people
Ambassadors of Oman to Russia
Ambassadors of Oman to Ukraine
Omani diplomats